November Tear is a Ugandan film written and directed by Richard Nondo and stars Daphne Ampire, 
Joel Okuyo Atiku Prynce, Raymond Rushabiro, Cindy Sanyu and Housen Mushema (as Ziraba). It premiered on August 11, 2019 at Century Cinema in Kampala.

Plot
November Tear tells a story of Anenda (played by Daphine Ampire) who is forced out of home by her stepmother. While on a journey to find her late mother's kinsmen, she is engulfed in a harsh reality of sex slavery. The film covers the silent but dangerous activity of trafficking of women that became common in 2018 and early 2019

Other Cast 

 Natukunda Vastine Abwooki (as Twinomugisha)
 Susan Kaylie Busingye (as Miriam)	
 Bryan Byamukama - Ghetto Boy (as Powers Byamukama Bryan)
 Grace Gashumba - Rema (as Gracie Tasha Gashumba)

 Milka Irene (as Mama Anenda)
 Eyangu James (as Barman)
 Sarafina Muhawenimana (as Ruth)
 River Dan Rugaju (as Turyamureeba) 
 Bangi Solome
 Ba3shir (as Faroukh Junior)

References

External
 

Films set in Uganda
2019 films
Films shot in Uganda
English-language Ugandan films
2010s English-language films